James Eyre may refer to:
Sir James Eyre (judge) (1734–1799), English judge
Sir James Eyre (British Army officer) (1930–2003)
James Eyre (philologist) (1748–1813), English philologist
Sir James Eyre (physician) (1792–1857), English physician and mayor of Hereford

See also
Jim Eyre (disambiguation)